Lost Stallions: The Journey Home is a 2008 family/drama film directed by David Rotan and starring Mickey Rooney.

Plot 
After the death of his father, troubled teen Jake (Alex Hugh) travels with his mother to Harmony Ranch, a special retreat for families dealing with problems. There, Jake gets to know Troubadour, a young distressed stallion. Ranch owner Chief (Mickey Rooney), works to calm the uneasy horse. Jake witnesses Chief's determination with the stallion, and begins to see the wisdom in the old man's life. When Troubadour runs away, Jake makes it his mission to bring the lost stallion home. The ranch hand Grey Wolf (Roger Willie) explains to Jake the Native American legend of Heaven's Pathway, a mountain that towers over Harmony Ranch, said to be a place where wounded souls go to find peace. With this knowledge, Jake sets out with his new friends Nicki (Rachael Handy) and Isaac (Evan Tilson Stroud), two other troubled teens, on a journey to the top of Heaven's Pathway in search of Troubadour.

Cast 
 Alex Hugh as Jake
 Mickey Rooney as Chief
 Jan Rooney as Kate
 Megan Blake as Rachel
 Rachael Handy as Nicki
 R. Keith Harris as Mack
 Evan Tilson Stroud as Isaac
 Roger Willie as Grey Wolf
Trey Vickers as Bullied Teen
 Robert Boyles as Gang Member 1
 Alan Kachur as Joey

References

External links 
 

2008 films
2008 drama films
American drama films
2000s English-language films
2000s American films